Gabriela Abreu Severino also known as Melody (born February 4, 2007) is a Brazilian singer and songwriter. She became known for her falsetto.

Early life
According to her father, Thiago Abreu (better known as MC Belinho), Gabriella dreamed of becoming a singer from a young age. Her father is a funk carioca singer. Her sister is two years older and is known as Bella Angel.
According with her father, Thiago Abreu, better known more as Belinho, Gabriella dreams to be a singer from a very young age, due to her influence, who is also a funk singer. Sister Bella Angel is also pursuing a music career. The mother of the girls, for her part, did not interfere in the musical career of the two until January 2019, claiming to be impeded by her father and her daughters, a situation confirmed by Belinho himself.

Career

2015: "Fale de Mim" and falsetto
Melody has won national notoriety in early of 2015, after posting a video on her Facebook page singing the song "Fale de Mim", a song written by her father, Belinho. In a next video, she tried to do a falsetto by Christina Aguilera that went viral. Soon after, she made another video doing falsetto, this time with a friend of her father's.

Melody is considered one of the most influential Brazilian children on the internet.

2016–2017: No parodies
In 2016 Melody announced through social media that she would no longer make falsette parodies. And that would improve his singing for his next songs.

2018–present: "Tô Bem, Tô Zen" and "Assalto Perigoso"
On June 5, 2018, Melody released her new videoclip. Vai rebola that reached 21,708,111 views, just on her channel. Months later, she dyed her hair to blonde for future work. For the 2018 FIFA World Cup, she released the hit Som da Copa in partnership with singer Vakeria. A month later, she, along with her sister Bella Angel, released the new hit Tô Bem, Tô Zen, through the KondZilla channel, with the participation of some famous, such as the youtuber "Viih Tube", the youtuber "Gregory Kessey" and the singer "Nicks Vieira". Weeks after its release, the clip was ranked 4th on YouTube's high. In three months, the videoclip reached 80,793,549 views, and on October 16, she, together with the duo Carlos and Christian, released together the singer's hit Hoje eu tô um Nojo and hit 4,647,647 views. And his song Assalto Perigoso is currently successful on the radio and among the famous, reaching a considerable position in the lists of successes.
In 2022 Melody becomes the youngest artist in Latin America to reach a global Spotify top 200 rank with the song Pipoco.

Artistry

Musical style, genres and influences

The rhythm of Melody's songs is Pop and Funk melody, the timbre of Melody is lyric Soprano, with treble and falsetto tuning, Melody grew up listening to international artists such as Christina Aguilera, Mariah Carey and Ariana Grande, most of her covers are falsettes where she sing the great songs of her inspirations, when she was younger Melody made a cover using only Miriah Carrey falsettes where she tried to bring her highs closer to the singer's, Melody telling to EGO, "Falset is part of my career" where it says that it decreases to make falsetto but it will not stop, Melody also did a cover on YouTube at Christmas saying she was the Brazilian Miriah Carey and Ariana Grande. Melody has already said that Ariana Grande was her biggest inspiration for her artistic career, where most of her cover songs are by Ariana, many of these songs have gone viral with millions of views.

Discography

Singles

As featured artist

Awards and nominations

References

External links
 

2007 births
21st-century Brazilian singers
21st-century Brazilian women singers
Brazilian child singers
Brazilian pop singers
Living people
Singers from São Paulo
Women in Latin music